YTU may refer to:
   
 Yıldız Technical University (Turkish: Yıldız Teknik Üniversitesi), İstanbul, Turkey
 Yangon Technological University (Burmese: ရန်ကုန် နည်းပညာ တက္ကသိုလ်), Yangon, Myanmar
 Ytu (beetle), a genus of beetles